Nymphoides sivarajanii is a critically endangered aquatic plant of the family Menyanthaceae endemic to Chettipadi in Malappuram district in Kerala, India.

References

sivarajanii
Flora of Kerala